Justin Williams (born May 12, 1984) is an American professional basketball player who currently plays for San Lorenzo.

High school
Born in Chicago, Illinois, Williams attended Thornwood High School, in South Holland, Illinois, where he played high school basketball.

College career
Williams played college basketball the Colby Community College, from 2002 to 2004, and at the University of Wyoming, with the Wyoming Cowboys, from 2004 to 2006.

Professional career
Williams went undrafted by an NBA team and started to play with the NBA Development League's Dakota Wizards, averaging 12.1 points, 12.3 rebounds and 3.08 blocks in 12 games. He was signed by the Sacramento Kings to a first 10-day contract on January 5, 2007.  After the Kings released power forward Maurice Taylor on January 23, Williams was signed for the rest of season after his two 10-day contracts expired.

On February 16, 2008, Williams was waived by Sacramento together with teammate Dahntay Jones to make room for a trade that sent the Kings' veteran point guard Mike Bibby to the Atlanta Hawks. On March 7, he was signed by the Houston Rockets to a 10-day contract. He played in one game for the Rockets.

Williams was brought to Golden State Warriors training camp on September 27, 2008, but he was cut after appearing in two pre-season games.

On October 16, 2008, Williams was signed by the Charlotte Bobcats. But six days later, he was waived again after failing to impress in three pre-season games.

In 2012, Williams signed with the Los Angeles D-Fenders of the NBA D-League. He played in one game for the D-Fenders recording just one foul in two minutes of play.

In 2013, he was signed as an import for GlobalPort Batang Pier in the Philippines. He was replaced midseason by Walter Sharpe. He later joined the San Miguel Beermen.

Argentinean League
Williams joined Ciclista Olímpico for the 2015 Argentinean league Liga Nacional de Básquet.

Titanes de Barranquilla (2021)
In 2021, Williams played for the Colombian team Titanes de Barranquilla in the 2021 BCL Americas season. He led the league in blocks with 2.8 blocks per game.

Player profile
Williams is best known for his shot-blocking and rebounding abilities. While playing for the University of Wyoming in the 2006 Mountain West Conference Tournament on March 11, he recorded a triple-double in a second-round game against the University of Utah with 10 points, 15 rebounds, and 12 blocked shots.
In 2015, Williams lead the Argentinean league in rebounds (11.2) and blocks (3.9).

Sexual assault case
On October 17, 2007, Sacramento police searched Williams' home in a northern Sacramento neighborhood.  The following day, at a press conference, a police spokesman indicated that they were conducting an ongoing sexual assault investigation, resulting from a young woman's appearance at a local hospital.

Williams, who was traveling with the Sacramento Kings for an exhibition game in Albuquerque, New Mexico, was put on a leave of absence and sent home in order to hire legal counsel. On November 13, 2007, Sacramento District Attorney Jan Scully concluded that Williams would not be charged for anything due to evidence not supporting the filing of any criminal charges in the case.

Awards and accomplishments

Club
GlobalPort Batang Pier
ASEAN Basketball League: (2013)

Individual
BCL Americas blocks leader: (2021)
2× Liga Nacional de Básquet rebounding leader: (2016, 2017)
Argentine League MVP: (2016)
ABL Defensive Player of the Year: (2014)

References

External links
NBA player profile @ NBA.com
NBA Development League player profile @ NBA.com
Wyoming athletic bio
Ciclista Olímpico current roster

1984 births
Living people
African-American basketball players
American expatriate basketball people in Argentina
American expatriate basketball people in the Philippines
American expatriate basketball people in Venezuela
American men's basketball players
ASEAN Basketball League players
Centers (basketball)
Ciclista Olímpico players
Dakota Wizards players
Guaros de Lara (basketball) players
Houston Rockets players
Los Angeles D-Fenders players
Junior college men's basketball players in the United States
NorthPort Batang Pier players
Philippine Basketball Association imports
Power forwards (basketball)
Sacramento Kings players
San Miguel Beermen players
Saigon Heat players
Undrafted National Basketball Association players
Wyoming Cowboys basketball players
Basketball players from Chicago
21st-century African-American sportspeople
20th-century African-American people
Titanes de Barranquilla players